Ləki (also, Lyaki) is a village and municipality in the Agdash Rayon of Azerbaijan.  It has a population of 3,941.

Notable natives 

 Tofig Gasimov — Minister of Foreign Affairs of Azerbaijan (1992-1993).

See also
Aşağı Ləki
Yuxarı Ləki

References 

Populated places in Agdash District